The Toronto machete attack was a misogynist terrorist attack in a Toronto erotic spa on 24 February 2020.

Incident
Surveillance video showed the perpetrator leaving his home by foot towards the spa which was less than two kilometres from his home. At the spa he drew a 17-inch sword and killed receptionist Ashley Arzaga. The sword was engraved with the words "thot slayer." Thot is a slang word for a sexually promiscuous woman similar to "whore."

The owner of the spa observed the attack and was set upon by the perpetrator. As the owner and the perpetrator struggled on the floor, the owner disarmed the perpetrator and stabbed him in the back, critically injuring him. During the attack, the perpetrator shouted misogynistic expletives. The owner of the spa suffered serious injuries to her arm and finger.

Victims
Emergency crews were called to the spa after reports of a bleeding man and woman outside. They were taken to hospital with serious injuries.

Inside the spa, a woman was found dead. She was later identified as 24-year-old Ashley Noell Arzaga. She was described by friends as a doting mother to a five-year-old girl.

Arrest
The 17-year-old perpetrator was arrested and charged with first degree murder and attempted murder. The Youth Criminal Justice Act prevents him from being named because of his age.

A note was found on the perpetrator which read "Long Live the Incel Rebellion." The perpetrator told paramedics that he had come to the spa to kill everyone inside the building, and that he was glad to have killed one person. A forensic search of the perpetrator's computer found web searches related to incels and images of Alek Minassian and another incel mass killer. The perpetrator's profile on Steam stated that he was a "Proud Incel." When asked by police why he identified as an incel, the perpetrator stated: "You don't choose to become an incel. You are born one."

In May 2020, the charges were upgraded to "murder - terrorist activity" and "attempted murder - terrorist activity". In a joint statement, the Royal Canadian Mounted Police and Toronto Police Service announced that investigations had determined that the attack "was inspired by the Ideologically Motivated Violent Extremist (IMVE) movement commonly known as INCEL". Incels are members of a misogynistic online subculture that define themselves as unable to find a romantic or sexual partner. The RCMP and TPS also said: "As a result, federal and provincial Attorneys General have consented to commence terrorism proceedings, alleging that the murder was terrorist activity ... and the attempted murder was terrorist activity." This was the first time in Canada that someone was charged with terrorism because of a misogynist ideology.

On September 14, 2022, the perpetrator entered a guilty plea to murder and attempted murder.

See also
 2021 Atlanta spa shootings

References

2020 in Toronto
Crime in Toronto
February 2020 events in Canada
Incel-related violence
Stabbing attacks in Canada
Terrorism in Canada
Violence in Canada